Oliver Rifai (born 15 June 1993, in Amsterdam) is a Dutch professional footballer who currently plays as a centre back for FC Lisse in the Dutch Topklasse. He formerly played for Telstar.

External links
 Voetbal International profile 

1993 births
Living people
Dutch footballers
SC Telstar players
Eerste Divisie players
Derde Divisie players
Footballers from Amsterdam
FC Lisse players
Association football defenders